Twisties are a type of cheese curl corn-based snack food product, available mainly in Australia, and other Oceanian countries such as Papua New Guinea, New Caledonia, Vanuatu and Fiji, the Southeast Asian countries Malaysia, Thailand, Singapore and Brunei, and the island of Mauritius in the Indian Ocean. They are also available in Italy, but marketed as "Fonzies", and in France as "Belin Croustilles". It was launched in 1950 by the General Foods Corporation. The brand name is owned by The Smith's Snackfood Company. While originally an Australian-owned company, Smith's was acquired in August 1998 by Frito-Lay, the second largest producer of snack foods in Australia, which in turn is owned by American multi-national PepsiCo. In Malaysia, Twisties is a product of Mondelēz International, after having been a part of Danone and later, Kraft Foods previously. In Thailand, the Twisties trademark is owned by Lay's, which like The Smith's Snackfood Company, is owned by PepsiCo.

In March 2021 Smith's controversially ended the ongoing debate of "most popular flavour" in Australia by publishing the annual sales figures showing that Chicken flavour out sells Cheese by a factor of almost 2 to 1.

History 
In the early 1950s, Melbourne businessman Isador Magid imported a rotary head extruder from the United States which initially did not work. After bringing out a technical expert from the US as well as receiving valuable advice from the CSIRO, Magid started producing Twisties. The product was popular but large scale distribution was difficult so Magid decided to sell the machine and the brand in 1955 to Monty Lea from Darrell Lea for £12,000.  Monty and his brother Harris experimented with the machine further using rice and various flavourings. Twisties became popular in Australia - some of its early success is attributed to promotional activity that included advertising the product on Graham Kennedy and Bert Newton's TV show In Melbourne Tonight, making it one of the earliest products advertised on that program.  After an unsuccessful attempt to launch Twisties in the UK and competition for shelf space in Australia the Lea brothers agreed to sell the Twisties brand to the Smith's Snackfood Company.

During the late 1990s the Twisties brand went through a brand overhaul, coinciding with the acquisition of The Smith's Snackfood Company by Frito-Lay. During the brand overhaul the appearance of the packet was changed to a more modernised look, adopting its current logo. As well as this, the texture of the snack itself was altered, resulting in a smoother finish.

Twisties were originally available only in 'Cheese' flavour, but 'Chicken' and 'Wicked Cheddar Zig-Zag' flavours were later introduced and became a standard part of the product line. There have also been flavours abroad as diverse as 'Toffee', 'Tomato', 'Salmon Teriyaki' and 'Peri Peri', where the local palate suits them the most.

Twisties are eaten as a snack in themselves, or sometimes in a sandwich as a "Twistie buttie" or "Twisties roll", by serving the packet contents between two slices of buttered bread or in a roll.

In 1997, a Twisties batch was recalled after reports of consumers finding pieces of fine wire in packs, there were no reports of injuries. The company thought that the wire resulted from machinery malfunction. In 2014, Twisties were one of the products removed from shops in Malaysia due to concerns around contamination from pork products.

In 2001, Frito-Lay lost a trademark dispute with Aldi Stores, as Aldi's 'Chazoos' cheese twists were not considered to infringe on the registered trademark of Twisties on the basis of packaging, extrusion production or the sound of the product name. Aldi won the appeal as they argued that the phrase 'Cheezy Twists' described their product contents and was not used as their registered trademark.

In 2009, Twisties packets reduced in size from 50 grams to 45 grams, with the company choosing to reduce portion size rather than increase retail prices due to higher costs for raw materials. Later that year, consumer group Choice flagged Twisties as a product which had shrunk but retained the same retail price in a shinier, re-designed packet containing less Twisties.

In 2011, comedian Danny McGinlay hosted an experimental cooking comedy show for the Adelaide Fringe. His show, 'Food Dude: recipes for disaster' featured 'Aussie sushi' which contained beetroot and Twisties.

In 2014, a trio of hikers lost overnight in Lerderderg State Park were sustained by half a bag of Twisties. After the snack was finished, bushwalker Kirrilee Ord turned the Twisties packet inside out and attempted to use the reflective side to signal rescue helicopters. This effort was unsuccessful, but the group was later found by a search party.

In 2017, the Fair Work Commission found an electrician was fairly fired for not attending work, as he used a Twisties packet as a Faraday cage to negate the GPS function on his PDA.

Chef Adriano Zumbo has created a lime and cheese Twisties zumbaron, which is a cheesy Twisties-flavoured macaron with lime filling.

Ingredients and manufacturing process

Since the snack's creation, its base ingredient has been ground corn, rice and agar. Other base ingredients standard in every flavour are vegetable oil, whey protein, salt, and monosodium glutamate (E621) as a flavour enhancer. Ingredients differ depending on the variety of Twisties.

Wendyl Nissen's review of packaged food noted that Twisties are a bit better than other super market snacks because the cheese flavouring is sourced from milk solids rather than chemical flavourings.

In 2011, The Herald Sun highlighted that Twisties contain not only MSG itself, but also HVP (hydrolysed vegetable protein) which is a source of MSG.

The ingredients for Cheese flavour are as follows, in order of percentage of product: corn and rice cereal, vegetable oil, whey powder, cheese powder, monosodium glutamate (E621), salt, hydrolyzed vegetable protein, flavour, yeast extract, potassium chloride, cream powder, milk powder, natural colouring (paprika extract and carotene), lactic acid.

The Twisties mixture is made by heating, shearing and pressurising corn, semolina, rice grits and water in a rotary head or random extruder, also known as the 'Twisties Press'. When the liquid mixture is passed through a hole between a spinning plate and a stationary plate, it expands, cools and solidifies to make characteristic knobbly surfaced, squiggly Twisties. A metal lug cuts the mixture into lengths. After forming, the pieces are oven baked before being flavoured with a coating of vegetable oil and a dusting of powdered whey, cheese powder, salt, monosodium glutamate, lactic acid and two types of food colouring. Factory seconds are sometimes fed to farm animals.

Flavours

Twisties has a large variety of flavours which are sold in Australia, and in the different islands. Of these are the main flavours 'Cheese' and 'Chicken', found in any country that sells them. The islands have a more diverse selection of flavours available normally, however Australia experiences more limited edition flavours. This is due to The Smith's Snackfood Company's aim to "[re-energise] consumers' love for the Twisties brand", according to the company's senior marketing director Jenni Dill.

Twisties have not been localised or produced in Mauritius as of yet. The country's supply of Twisties are imported from Malaysia.

Australia

Cheese - has existed since the snack's inception
Chicken

1970s 

Bacon - released in the early 1970s, discontinued after a year due to poor sales.

Barbecue flavour was introduced late 70s, discontinued.

Steak flavour was available in the late 60’s, discontinued.

1990s 

Tangy Barbecue - released in 1992 and spruiked as the "first flavour extension for the brand for some years...".
Tomato Tang - released in 1993.
Tangy Cheese Crunch - released in 1998 alongside the existing Cheese flavour, marketed as a providing a "...lighter, smoother crunch and a superb cheese flavour with an unexpected tang." This was not welcomed by all, as the Financial Review likened the flavour relaunch to changing recipes and "...tinkering with a national icon.".

2000s 

Flamin' Hot - released for six weeks in 2001 alongside the toffee flavour, as part of the 'Heat vs Sweet' competition. Consumers voted via an 1800 phone number to choose their preferred flavours.
Sweet Butter Toffee - released in 2001, limited edition, currently discontinued
Cheese'O's - circular Twisties released in 2003.
Zig-Zag - Twisties formed into zigzag shapes, were discontinued, re-released in 2016
Wicked Cheddar - released in 2004
Hawaiian Pizza O's & X's - limited edition, released in 2004, currently discontinued
Cheese-O's - limited edition, released in 2005, currently discontinued

Bag O' Bones Spookily Seasoned - released in 2005, currently discontinued
Hot Dogs - limited edition, released in 2006 as part of a Tazos promotion involving The Simpsons, currently discontinued
Cheeky Cheese - limited edition, released in 2006 as part of a different Simpsons-themed promotion
BBQ Sauce - currently discontinued
Corn Puff - Twisties formed into a puffed ball shape
Melted Butter - currently discontinued

2010s 

Chilli Cheese - limited edition, released in 2011, re-released in 2015
Cheese Burger - limited edition, released in 2011, re-released in 2012, 2013 and again in 2019
Spicy Burger - limited edition, released in 2012
Saucy BBQ - limited edition, released in 2012, currently discontinued
Pizza - limited edition, released in 2012, re-released in 2017
Turns Your Tongue Blue! - limited edition, released in 2012, marketed as being able to temporarily change the colour of your tongue to blue, re-released 2017
Peri Peri - limited edition 2013, re-released in 2017
Cheese & Mite Flavour - limited edition in 90 gram packets, released in 2013, based on the iconic Vegemite flavour (referred to on the packet as 'Mite'), currently discontinued
Cheese & Bacon - limited edition, released in 2013, re-released in 2015
Flaming Hot - limited edition, originally released in 2014, re-released in 2019
Hot Dog - limited edition, released in 2014
Bag of Ghosts! - limited edition, released in October 2014 as a Halloween-themed product
Taco - limited edition, released in 2015
Tangy Tomato - limited edition, released in 2015
SOUR - limited edition, only at 7-Eleven, released in 2015, featured an astringent yellow-green lemon on pack
Cheesy Popcorn - limited edition, released in 2016, cheese flavoured popcorn
Cheesy Chilli - limited edition, released in 2020
Nachos - limited edition, released in 2020
Cheesy Bacon - limited edition, released in 2020
Margherita Pizza limited edition, released in 2020
Sticky BBQ Ribs limited edition, released in 2021
Meatlovers Pizza limited edition, released in 2021

Papua New Guinea, New Caledonia, Vanuatu and Fiji
Cheese (Cheese Fromage in Vanuatu and New Caledonia)
Chicken (Chicken Poulet in Vanuatu and New Caledonia)
Extra Cheese (Extra Cheese Fromage en Plus in Vanuatu and New Caledonia)
Cheese & Onion (Cheese & Onion Fromage & Oignon in Vanuatu and New Caledonia)
Mexicain
Pizza
Barbecue
Red Tongue (similar to Australia's Turns Your Tongue Blue! flavour)
Hot N Spicy
Tomato

Thailand
Chicken released in the late 1980s, re-released in August 2018
Cheese
Choco Banana - The biscuit is chevron shaped, with a chocolate banana filling.

Malaysia
In 1995, Twisties were noted as one of the most popular snacks in Malaysia, despite at the time, many Malaysians registering dislike for beef and cheese flavours.

Cheeky Cheddar Cheese
Roast Chicken Dance
Kaboom! BBQ Curry"Cherry Tomato BombSawadee Thai Sweet ChiliChilli Cheese on FireSpicy Seaweed Splash - launched in 2021Fizz - similar to Australia's Turns Your Tongue Blue! flavour, except with an effervescent effectWhoa! Spicy GarlicLime ChilliHoney BBQ WingsSpicy SausageSalmon Teriyaki - launched in 2006 as part of the International range alongside Chicken Tandoori flavour.Chicken TandooriDouble Kick - contains two flavours at once, released in 2010Super Starz - released as part of a 2012 promotion with Viacom promoting the MTV World Stage music festival in 2012Bolognese & Cheese OnionChicken Chorizo & Smokey SausagePeppery Jalapeno & PickleCoffee Bonanza - limited edition, currently discontinued

 United Kingdom 
Twisties were introduced to the United Kingdom in 1994, with package design including the words "Australia's Favourite Snack", a crocodile denoting the snack's "snap and crunch", as well as a boomerang, and "flames" in red (cheese flavour) and purple (hot spice flavour). At the time they were described as "irregularly-shaped corn sticks" and similar in appearance to Golden Wonder's Nik-Naks snack.

 Bondi Beach - in 1994
 Outback Hot Spice - in 1994

Marketing
Twisties have been advertised since its last brand overhaul in the late 1990s with the well-known slogan "Life's pretty straight without..." In the English-speaking Oceanic countries where Western vernacular isn't as well understood, its slogan is "Life is fun with..." Typical television advertisements play on the slogan by showing people in mundane situations being transported to surreal and exciting environments when they eat Twisties. Twisties are claimed to be the "number one extruded snack brand" by Smith's.

Twisties, as well as other snack brands owned by The Smith's Snackfood Company, included Oddbodz cards (and later, Space Oddbodz) in specially marked packets for consumers to collect. In late 1996, Oddbodz cards were replaced by Hypa Heads cards, which were available in a 40-card series with a glow-in-the-dark four-image cartoon story requiring a separately purchased Hypervision Viewer. In 2002, Tazo-like (pog-like collectible cardboard discs) Simpsons-themed 'Pickers' discs were included in Twisties packets (as well as other Smith's brands Lay's and Cheetos), which had a velcro backing and could be picked up from the ground with a branded Pickers Bungee Ball. Other branded inclusions were related to Yu-Gi-Oh!, and other popular franchises. This could be attributed to Twisties' success.

Advertising for the snack has almost completely stopped in the last decade in comparison to its past promotions. Twisties' largest (and most expensive) campaign ever was between 1982-1983 with its "Twisties jumper" campaign. Lillian Darrell, a previously unknown actor, played the role of an old woman knitting a Twisties jumper straight from a sheep. The promotion included free knitting patterns and free bags of Twisties. Other promotions were attempted afterwards, but they resulted in little success. Currently, Twisties relies heavily on limited edition flavours to keep hype on a profitable level.

In 1986, Fred Nile complained about a Twisties television commercial to the Advertising Standards Council. He alleged that the Viking-themed advertisement used occult imagery and goats' heads and that it would disturb children. The commercial received a record number of 680 complaints alleging that it was "...demonic and harmful to children," but it was noted that many were in similar handwriting. It was removed from television, this was attributed to marketing reasons rather than the pressure groups.

In 1992, Natalie Imbruglia acted in the role of a waitress in a Twisties ad shot at Taronga Zoo. In 2014 while living in London, she said that her mother still posts her packets of Twisties.

In 1995, Twisties was the sole advertising sponsor for the Ten Network's screening of Melrose Place, stating that the two brands worked together as Melrose Place was focused on fantasy and aspiration, and that Twisties are "...fantasy in a pack.". Sponsorship messages were placed at the beginning, middle and end of each episode depicting Melrose Place actors Laura Leighton and Grant Show eating Twisties at home, and Jodie Bissett being served Twisties on a silver platter. Neil Shoebridge criticised the advertisements as being "...flat and lifeless," and relying on gimmickry, but Rochelle Burbury credited them as witty, but that the existing old Twisties "air volley ball" advertisement was a detraction.

Twisties has been credited as one of the "...first packaged good brands..." to launch on the internet in 1995 with its 'Space Girls' advertising campaign.

A later promotion was credited as the 'Space Girls Straighten Twisties' campaign, with television advertisements screened in February 1997. The commercial featured a teenage boy being abducted by female space aliens, as they were interested in his packet of Twisties. The commercials were launched at the same time as the premier of the alien-themed Dark Skies series. The website included 'eyewitness reports' of the abduction and hid clues in a fictitious newspaper, the 'Twisted Examiner'. Visitors could download a Twisties screensaver, video and Windows 95 theme pack. As part of the campaign, from August to October 1997, consumers could win $10,000 if they located a straight Twistie in their Twisties packet. From the 13 million packs in circulation, all of the five straight Twisties were found.

A 1998 advertisement featured Darren Gilshenan of Full Frontal.

 Unofficial celebrity endorsements 
In 1998, Brooke Satchwell credited chicken flavour Twisties as the key to VCE success, because they alleviated her car sickness while travelling between her Mornington Peninsula home and the set of Neighbours at Nunawading.

In 2001, Cate Blanchett said that Twisties were what she missed most about Australia, with relatives posting them to her in England.

In 2011, footballer Billy Brownless claimed that cheese Twisties were beneficial for treating a hangover.

In 2013, Chrissy Amphlett said that Twisties were something she missed about Australia.

In 2017, Tom Parker Bowles said that chicken Twisties are one of his favourite foods.

International variants
Twisties in New Zealand are drastically different from the Australian variety in terms of both packet design, marketing and the shape of the cheese curl itself. Called 'twisties'[sic], they are manufactured by Bluebird Foods and are only available in cheese flavour. The packet features a penguin mascot about to throw a cheese curl as if it were a ball, and has a completely different slogan as compared to its Australian counterpart: it being "It's a straight world without Twisties!" They are less dense than the Australian variety, and their shape is more tubular and curvy without imperfections in the shape (Australian Twisties are more jagged and detailed). In New Zealand the Australian variety is not widely available.

Twisties are also sold on the Italian market with the name 'Fonzies', inspiring its name from the character Arthur Fonzarelli (nicknamed 'Fonzie') from the popular television sitcom Happy Days''. 

Fonzies are pale yellow in colour, because they do not use the bright orange food colouring that normal Twisties use. Their cheese flavouring is very similar to that used in the Oceanian varieties bearing the 'Twisties' name, lighter and less prone to clump together during consumption, and with a more natural cheese flavour. The only quality that differentiates it from said varieties is its slight egg-like taste upon first bite, though it wears away after continued consumption. It is made through the same rotary head extrusion technique as in all other localisations, though the snacks are much smaller than those found in Australia, sticking more to a general thin shape rather than a selection of both thin and stout snacks. Its smell is much more pungent, as well. Fonzies are available in 'Gli Originali' ('Original') flavour, as well as 'Time Out', 'Choco', 'Hot Passion', 'Bacon', 'Hot Chili' and others.

The ingredients for Fonzies are as follows, in order of percentage of product: corn grit 62.2%, palm oil, cheese powder 6%, whey powder, salt, flavour, baking powder, yeast extract, flavour enhancers (E621, E627, E631), lactose (from milk), smoke flavour.

Although sold in Italy, Fonzies are produced in Germany by LU Snack Foods GmbH. In the GCC countries, they are also sold with the name 'Fonzies', produced by Mondelez Malaysia.

References

External links
Twisties page by Smith's Snackfoods

Australian snack foods
Brand name snack foods
The Smith's Snackfood Company brands